Osai is a 1984 Indian Tamil-language film, directed by K. Vijayan. The film stars Mohan, Nalini, Raadhika and Nizhalgal Ravi. It is a remake of the Hindi film Shor.

Cast
 Mohan 
 Nalini 
 Nizhalgal Ravi 
 Poornam Viswanathan 
 R. S. Manohar 
 Raadhika 
 Shalini as Child Artist
 Thengai Srinivasan
Bindu Ghosh

Soundtrack 
Soundtrack was composed by Shankar–Ganesh. The song "Ek Pyaar Ka Nagma" from the original Hindi film has been retained in this version.
"Hari Om" - Malaysia Vasudevan, Vani Jairam
"Poove Poove" - S. Janaki
"Silu Silunnu" - S. Janaki
"Allah" - K. J. Yesudas
"Oru Paadal" - SPB, Vani Jairam
"Vaazhkai Endru" - SPB, Vani Jairam

References

1980s Tamil-language films
1984 films
Films scored by Shankar–Ganesh
Tamil remakes of Hindi films
Films directed by K. Vijayan